Weapons of Honour (French: Armes d'honneur) are ceremonial weapons awarded for service or assistance to France.

History
Swords of honour were awarded during the Ancien Régime for exceptional service. On 30 April 1746, Minister of the Navy Maurepas awarded such a sword to privateer Pierre Anguier for his intervention in the Jacobite rising of 1745.

Established on 25 December 1799 and issued by the French Consulate, weapons of honour were awarded as military awards for feats of arms. The civilian version of this distinction is the scarf of honour (l'écharpe d'honneur). This completed and materialised the practice of solemnly declaring a citizen or group of citizens to have bien mérité de la Patrie.

Weapons of honour were replaced during the First French Empire by the institution of the chivalry Order of the Legion of Honour. Recipients of weapons of honour automatically received the Legion of Honour after its inception.

Categories
Each component of the Napoleonic armies had its own distinction and weapons of honour:

Drumsticks given to the drummers
Whips of honour awarded to the drivers of artillery
Guns and swords awarded to soldiers and grenadiers
Golden grenades to artillery assigned to the accuracy of their shots
Carbines and rifles assigned to cavalry
Pistols of Honour awarded to officers
Trumpets assigned to the bugle and trumpeters 
Sword of Honour (or Sabre of Honour), divided into three categories, are awarded for exceptional actions outside the scope of the items above.

Notes and references

Notes

References

Bibliography 
Armes d'honneur via Napoleon.org (French)
Trompette d’honneur, page of the Musée de l'Armée depicting a trumpet of honour

Ceremonial weapons
Honorary weapons
1799 establishments in France
Military awards and decorations of France